Marija Strojnik Scholl (born 13 July 1950 in Ljubljana) is a Slovene astrophysicist currently working as a distinguished professor at the Optical Research Center in León, Mexico. She is best known for developing an autonomous system for optical navigation based on CCD technology which is currently used in nearly all commercial aircraft and numerous spacecraft, including in the NASA Cassini mission.

Early life and education 
Strojnik Scholl developed an interest in optics at an early age, when accompanying her father, Aleš Strojnik to work. After graduating from high school, she enrolled in the physics program at the University of Ljubljana; however, her parents emigrated to the United States soon after that, and she followed them to Tempe, Arizona. There, Strojnik Scholl finished her undergraduate studies at the Arizona State University in only two years, as the only woman in her class. She continued her postgraduate studies at the same university and received a M.S. degree in Physics in 1974. She finished a M.S. in Optical Sciences in 1977 at the University of Arizona and a M.S. in Engineering (Engineering Executive Program) in 1981 at the University of California, Los Angeles. She finished her doctorate degree in Optical Sciences in 1979 at the College of Optical Sciences at the University of Arizona, as the first woman in the history of the optics department.

Career 
Specializing in infrared physics, she became manager of the optics department at the Rockwell International corporation, then a senior engineer at Honeywell and at the Jet Propulsion Laboratory (JPL). At the JPL, she designed, developed and implemented a novel system for autonomous optical navigation using star charts and an intelligent CCD-based camera. This system is the basis for autonomous navigation in all commercial aircraft, in satellites forming the GPS network, and others. The autonomous navigation system was used to facilitate navigation of the NASA's Cassini–Huygens probe to Saturn in 2005. Strojnik Scholl received several NASA Certificates for creative development and technological innovations

Based on her merits, Strojnik Scholl became a distinguished professor at the Optical Research Center (Centro de Investigaciones en Optica) in Mexico where she has been working on a method for direct detection of exoplanets using interferometry. She is a Fellow of the Optical Society (OSA) and SPIE, and was the editor of the journal Applied Optics, Infrared for two terms in addition to the Infrared Physics and Technology and The Scientific World Journal.

Awards 

 In 1996 she received 'The International Society for Optics and Photonics' (SPIE) George W. Goddard Award, as the first woman.
 In 1999 she was made an OSA Fellow. 
 She is also member of the Mexican Academy of Sciences since 2001. 
 In 1994 was mad a SPIE Fellow.
 In 2018, Professor Strojnik Scholl was awarded with the Emerita status to the Sistema Nacional de Investigadores (Mexican National Registry of Researchers). 
 She was part of a temporal exposition named "Knowledge without Borders" organized by The Slovenian Museum of Technology (Tehniški muzej Slovenije, TMS).

Personal life 
Marija Strojnik Scholl has three daughters which she raised herself after her husband passed away because of lateral sclerosis. Two of them became scientists themselves. In 2008, Strojnik Scholl was diagnosed with cancer which she has beaten several times with therapy.

References 

Slovenian physicists
Slovenian women physicists
Women astrophysicists
Arizona State University alumni
1950 births
Living people
Fellows of Optica (society)
Women in optics
Women physicists